Typhoon Kim, known in the Philippines as Typhoon Osang, was the second typhoon in a week to directly affect the Philippines during July 1980. Like Typhoon Joe, Kim formed from the near equatorial monsoon trough in the northwestern Pacific Ocean on July 19. The disturbance tracked quickly westward-northwest underneath a subtropical ridge, reaching tropical storm strength on the July 21 and typhoon strength on July 23. After developing an eye, Kim began to rapidly intensify, and during the afternoon of July 24, peaked in intensity as a super typhoon. Several hours later, Kim made landfall over the Philippines, but the storm had weakened considerably by this time. Throughout the Philippines, 40 people were killed, 2 via drownings, and 19,000 others were directly affected. A total of 12,000 homes were destroyed and 5,000 villages were flooded. Less than a week earlier, the same areas were affected by Joe; however, Kim was considered the more damaging of the two typhoons. Land interaction took its toll on Kim, and upon entering the South China Sea, the storm was down below typhoon intensity. Kim continued northwestward but its disrupted circulation prevented re-intensification, and it remained a tropical storm until hitting southern China July 27 to the northeast of Hong Kong, where only slight damage was reported. Later that day, Kim dissipated.

Meteorological history 

An area of disturbed weather developed in association with the monsoon trough that was situated near the equator on July 19. At 20:04 UTC, the Joint Typhoon Warning Center (JTWC) issued a Tropical Cyclone Formation Alert for the system, primarily because the disturbance was over warm water and low wind shear. Four hours later, the Japan Meteorological Agency (JMA) classified the system as a tropical depression.

The depression tracked west-northwest, passing south of Guam and very near Ulithi around noon on July 21. Post-storm analysis from the JTWC indicated that Kim attained tropical storm status six hours earlier, despite aircraft data suggesting that the storm was not well stacked vertically. Further intensification was slow to occur as Kim tracked west-northwest, following Typhoon Joe across the Philippine Sea. At 06:00 UTC on July 23, a Hurricane hunter aircraft indicated falling pressures and the beginning of an eyewall. Based on this, both the JTWC and JMA announced that Kim obtained typhoon intensity. Around this time, the Philippine Atmospheric, Geophysical and Astronomical Services Administration (PAGASA) also began to monitor the storm and assigned it with the local name Osang. Continuing to track west-northwest beneath a large subtropical ridge, Kim began to clear out an eye on the evening of July 23; subsequently, Kim, as forecast by the JTWC, entered a period of rapid deepening.

Almost immediately thereafter, reports from the same Hurricane Hunter aircraft indicated that the pressure of the typhoon rose sharply, likely in response to decreased inflow caused by Kim's close proximity to land. Continuing to weaken due to land interaction, Kim fell below typhoon intensity once it emerged into the South China Sea, according to both the JTWC and JMA. The JTWC expected Kim to revive over water in manner similar to Typhoon Joe, but this did not occur. The storm's inner core was disrupted by land, with Hurricane hunters constantly finding a poorly organized tropical cyclone. Kim began to move northwest in response to a weakness created in the subtropical ridge created by Joe. Twelve hours later, both the JTWC and JMA ceased tracking Kim.

Preparations and impact 

Typhoon Kim caused widespread flooding across Luzon. There, both Philippine Airlines and Philippine National Railways canceled all trips to the rest of the country. The coast guard suspended sailing permits to ships throughout the country. The Isabela province was the hardest hit by Typhoon Kim. Almost 15 people were killed in the Cagayan province. Across the Philippines, 40 people were killed, 2 via drownings, and 19,000 others were affected. A total of 12,000 homes were destroyed and 5,000 villages were flooded. Less than a week earlier, the same areas were affected by Typhoon Joe; Kim was considered the more damaging of the two systems.

The typhoon brought showers to much of southern China, extending as far north as Pratas Island, Taiwan (ROC). In Hong Kong, a No 1. hurricane signal was issued on July 25. The next day, the signal was increased to a No 3. hurricane signal. All signals were dropped late on July 22, after Kim moved inland. HKO observed  of rain over a 72-hour period. Within the vicinity of Hong Kong, minor damage was reported and there were no injuries. Power was knocked out in the urban city of Kowloon. Some villages were flooded and two landslides occurred.

See also 

Other typhoons named Kim
Similar early season Philippine typhoons
Typhoon Koryn (1993)
Typhoon Percy (1990)
Typhoon Peggy (1986)
Typhoon Vera (1983)

Notes

References

External links

1980 Pacific typhoon season
Typhoons in Hong Kong
Typhoons in China
1980 in China
1980 in Hong Kong
1980 disasters in the Philippines
Typhoons in the Philippines
Kim